Central Park Media, often abbreviated as CPM, was an American multimedia entertainment company based in New York City, New York and was headquartered in the 250 West 57th Street building in Midtown Manhattan (on the corner of Central Park, hence their name). They were one of the first companies to be active in the distribution of East Asian cinema, television series, anime, manga, and manhwa titles in North America, notably helping to make hentai popular in the region. Over its history, the company licensed several popular titles, such as Slayers, Revolutionary Girl Utena, the Tokyo Babylon OVAs, Project A-ko, and Demon City Shinjuku.

They had multiple divisions, each of which focused on offering different types of products and services. While a majority of their divisions handled anime and manga distribution, they also offered anime-related software and ran a website for UFO conspiracy theorists.

The company filed for bankruptcy on April 27, 2009. Since their bankruptcy, many of their former titles have been re-released by other companies.

History

Founding and growth
Central Park Media was founded in 1990 by John O'Donnell as an anime supplier. During its heyday, CPM incorporated MD Geist as part of its U.S. Manga Corps logo. Curiosity by anime fans seeing the "corporate spokes mecha" in CPM's titles resulted in MD Geist becoming one of the company's bestselling titles. In 1996, CPM commissioned MD Geist creator Koichi Ohata to write and direct a sequel; at the same time, Ohata made a director's cut of the first title, adding new scenes and expanding the storyline.

In 1992, CPM – through its Anime 18 division – released Urotsukidōji: Legend of the Overfiend, which became the first animated film to be given the NC-17 rating. Since its release, Urotsukidoji has become a cult classic among fans of anime, science fiction and horror genres, while at the same time, being one of the first anime titles to introduce the western public to the hentai genre. It was released in theaters across the United States in both subtitled and dubbed formats.

In the mid-1990s, CPM expanded to distributing manga and manhwa through CPM Manga and CPM Manhwa, respectively. CPM Manga also featured adaptations of MD Geist, Armored Trooper Votoms, and Project A-ko by American writers and artists.

Central Park Media headquarters was in the Fisk Building, located at 250 West 57th Street in Midtown Manhattan. They started out with just 3,400 square feet, but grew to 7,000 square feet in 1996 and would expand further to 10,000 square feet in January 2000. Through its history, the company has employed numerous figures in the video retail industry like Steven Kramer, Peter Castro, and Tom Reilly. In 2003, John Davis, Allen Rosenberg, and Stacey Santos were hired as account executives.

Financial problems
On May 26, 2006, Central Park Media laid off many of its employees, and rumors erupted that the company was planning to declare bankruptcy, supported by a statement from a representative at the convention Anime Boston. The following Monday, the company's managing director issued a statement acknowledging the lay-offs and attributing the cost-cutting to creditor problems following the January bankruptcy of the Musicland group.

The previous year, in 2005, CPM had discontinued its CPM Manga and CPM Manhwa line, also due to monetary problems. But CPM representatives have said that they had relaunched their manga and manhwa lines in January 2006.

On March 19, 2007, Japanese yaoi publisher Libre posted a notice on its website saying that CPM's Be Beautiful division was illegally translating and selling its properties. The titles in question were originally licensed to CPM by Japanese publisher Biblos, which was bought out by Libre in 2006 after a bankruptcy.

Bankruptcy and liquidation
Central Park Media filed for Chapter 7 bankruptcy on April 27, 2009, and liquidated with a debt of over US$1.2 million. Officially, the company had plans to re-release some older titles in the future. Right up until their bankruptcy, CPM still licensed their anime titles for North American television and VOD distribution, despite having not released anything on home video for over a year. Many of their titles have been shown on the Sci-Fi Channel, as well as Anime Selects, AZN Television and the Funimation Channel, and were available through iTunes. Some of their titles were also re-licensed by various anime companies, such as ADV Films, Bandai Entertainment, Funimation, Sentai Filmworks, Discotek Media, Nozomi Entertainment, and Media Blasters, and were re-released from 2004 into the present day. Some of their titles were either re-dubbed, such as Here Is Greenwood and Area 88 by Media Blasters and ADV Films, respectively, or have retained the original dub. Grave of the Fireflies was later re-licensed by ADV's successor Sentai Filmworks and was re-released in 2012.

Its website became offline permanently after its closure. The centralparkmedia.com domain was eventually transferred to a New York-based art dealer Atelier VGI several years later.

Distribution
Central Park Media was a key player in popularizing anime, with numerous firsts and promotions designed to introduce various works to American viewers. They were one of the first suppliers to sell anime box sets.

In 2002, the first instance of an anime having the storyboards as an alternate viewing option was released on the Collectors Edition of Grave of the Fireflies, more than 2,700 hand drawings synced to the audio tracks. They also focused on increasing TV airings of shows to capitalize on the International Channel, the Encore Channel and the streaming service Cartoon Network short-lived Toonami Reactor website.

Anime Test Drive was a promotion that started in 2003 which tested the markets and introduced American's to anime at a discounted rate. It was a way to market titles that may have been viewed as to expensive or inconvenience to purchase separately. Anime Test Drive DVDs offer two episodes of the listed anime series and 45 minutes of trailers.

In 2004, Central Park Media introduced Korean animation works into America after the success of the Animatrix, Aeon Flux, and Cubix with the release of Doggy Poo. In 2005, it sub-licensed seven anime titles to the US-based International Channel. It also licensed titles out to the broadband streaming service Movielink. In 2006, Central Park Media licensed some of their works to IGN Entertainment's digital download retail store Direct2Drive.

In 2007, Central Park Media licensed out Revolutionary Girl Utena: The Movie, Roujin Z, the Record of Lodoss War series, the Project A-ko series, Urusei Yatsura: Beautiful Dreamer, and Grave of the Fireflies to the Funimation Channel. These titles aired on the channel in 2007 before ADV Films took over the rights to Grave of the Fireflies and the film was streamed on VOD in the United States and Canada by Anime Network, following their bankruptcy.

Divisions

Asia Pulp Cinema
Asia Pulp Cinema was CPM's East Asian live-action film distribution division that began in 1999. They were most known for carrying Japanese erotic films, mostly starring actress Kei Mizutani, and films targeted at admirers of the otaku subculture, such as the Akihabara Trilogy.

US Manga Corps
US Manga Corps was the main anime distribution division for Central Park Media, catering to middle/high school students and older audiences. The US Manga Corps mascot is from MD Geist, from an OVA from the 1980s.

Software Sculptors
Software Sculptors was founded by John Sirabella, Sam Liebowitz, and Henry Lai in 1993, and specialized in anime-related software, such as screen savers featuring Ranma ½ and Bubblegum Crisis, as well as releasing anime on CD-ROM. They also released several anime titles, most notably Slayers, Revolutionary Girl Utena, and Cat Soup. The company was bought by CPM and was turned into one of their division labels. Sirabella stayed on with CPM until 1997, after which he would go on to form Media Blasters.

CPM Press

CPM Press (originally CPM Comics, then CPM Manga) was the manga and manhwa publication division. Manga titles were published under the label CPM Manga, and manhwa under CPM Manhwa. CPM also had an adult division under CPM Press known as Bear Bear Press, which largely published Americanized versions of some of their Anime 18 releases such as La Blue Girl. This division started in 1996 and folded the same year releasing only La Blue Girl and Demon Beast Invasion. Bear Bear Press was succeeded by Manga 18.

Anime 18

Anime 18 (A18 Corporation) was Central Park Media's distribution division for pornographic anime. Among its releases were Toshio Maeda's Legend of the Overfiend and La Blue Girl. The release of Legend of the Overfiend was the first hentai released in America. Anime 18 released its titles under several labels, with the main label – Anime 18 – used for hentai anime, Manga 18 for manga and manhwa pornography, and Be Beautiful Manga for yaoi manga. When Central Park Media went bankrupt in 2009, the licenses for some of Anime 18's products and movies were transferred to Critical Mass Video and Kitty Media.

Manga 18
Manga 18 was an English-language publisher of pornographic manga and manhwa which was the manga counterpart of Anime 18 and successor to Bare Bear Press.

Be Beautiful Manga
The counterpart of Anime 18 that specialized in yaoi manga. On March 19, 2007, Japanese yaoi publisher Libre announced that Be Beautiful Manga was illegally translating and selling their properties to their original owners.

Below the Radar
Below the Radar was a label that focused on live-action independent and non-mainstream media. Formed in March 2007.

Binary Media Works
Central Park Media's website unit that operated AnimeOne.com, a website that was dedicated to anime fandom, and UFOCity.com, a website that specialized in alien UFO sightings and hosted a community of UFO enthusiasts. It was shut down in 2004.

Productions 
Releases are only listed if the subtitling, dubbing, or other production work was handled by Central Park Media; rather than being licensed from prior versions. All of the titles are now published by other companies, if at all, due to Central Park Media's liquidation.

References

External links
 Official Website (Archived)
 

 
Anime companies
Defunct mass media companies of the United States
Dubbing (filmmaking)
Manga distributors
Manhwa distributors
Video production companies
Entertainment companies based in New York City
Mass media companies based in New York City
Mass media companies established in 1990
Mass media companies disestablished in 2009
Companies that have filed for Chapter 7 bankruptcy
Defunct companies based in New York City
1990 establishments in New York City
2009 disestablishments in New York (state)